Nationality words link to articles with information on the nation's poetry or literature (for instance, Irish or France).

Events

Works published

United Kingdom
 William Blake, Song of Liberty
 Maria Cowper, Original Poems on Various Occasions, a cousin of William Cowper, who helped her revise poems before publication
 Edward Jenningham, Stone Henge
 Janet Little, The Poetical Works of Janet Little, the Scotch Milkmaid
 Samuel Rogers, The Pleasures of Memory, 15 editions by 1806

Other
 Tomás António Gonzaga (as 'Dirceu'), Marília de Dirceu, first part, Brazil in Portuguese
 Francis Hopkinson, The Miscellaneous Essays and Occasional Writings of Francis Hopkinson, poetry and prose, posthumous, United States
 Thomas Odiorne, "The Progress of Refinement", philosophical long poem on man and nature, a precursor to later Romantic poetry, United States
 Rhijnvis Feith, Het Graf ("The Grave"), in four cantos, Netherlands

Births
Death years link to the corresponding "[year] in poetry" article:
 January 1 – Henrik Anker Bjerregaard (died 1842), Norwegian poet, dramatist and judge
 February 10 – Ioan Tegid (John Jones, died 1852), Welsh clergyman, scholar and poet
 March 7 – John Herschel (died 1871), English polymath
 April 1 – Andreas Kalvos (Ἀνδρέας Κάλβος, died 1869), Greek Romantic poet, writer and translator
 April 25 – John Keble (died 1866), English churchman and poet
 May 4 – Dorothea Primrose Campbell (died 1863), Scottish poet and novelist
 August 4 – Percy Bysshe Shelley (died 1822), English Romantic poet and radical
 December 18 – William Howitt (died 1879), English historical writer and poet
 December 27 – Pietro Zorutti (Pieri Çorut, died 1867), Friulian poet

Deaths
Birth years link to the corresponding "[year] in poetry" article:
 January – Jenny Clow ("Clarinda") (born 1766), Scottish domestic servant, a mistress and muse of Robert Burns, of tuberculosis
 John Edwards (born 1747), Welsh
 Georg Luis (born 1714), German

See also

Poetry
 List of years in poetry

Notes

18th-century poetry
Poetry